Michel Lévy Frères is a Parisian publishing house founded in 1836 by Michel Lévy with his brothers Nathan and Kalmus. Michel served as publisher until his death in 1875.

Michel Lévy Frères published such authors as Honoré de Balzac, Gustave Flaubert, and Antoinette Henriette Clémence Robert; some of their works were illustrated by Eugène Lampsonius.

External link

Book publishing companies of France
Companies based in Paris
Publishing companies established in 1836
Mass media in Paris
French companies established in 1836
French brands